8minute Solar Energy is an American photovoltaic (PV) developer of utility-scale PV power plants and energy storage.  

It has developed solar farms that includes Eagle Shadow Mountain Solar Farm which is a 420 MWp (300 MWAC) photovoltaic power station north of Las Vegas, Clark County, Nevada. Mount Signal Solar which is a 594 MWp (460 MWAC) photovoltaic power station west of Calexico, California, a 137 MW Springbok Solar Farm and the 191 MW Springbok 2 solar project, both located in Kern County, California.

History

It was founded by Tom Buttgenbach and Martin Hermann in 2009. In 2014, Kern County Board of Supervisors approved development of Redwood Solar Farm which received investment of $30 million by Macquarie Capital. In 2018, it had raised $200 million through a joint venture with J.P. Morgan Asset Management and Upper Bay Infrastructure Partners for its pipeline of utility-scale solar projects.

A 25 year pact was signed with Los Angeles Department of Water and Power in 2019.

In early 2020, 8minute Solar Energy received investments from the University of California system, J.P. Morgan Asset Management and Upper Bay Infrastructure Partners to fund development of solar projects.
In July 2019, the company sold its Holstein solar project to Duke Energy.
The Holstein project was the company's first completed development in Texas, with approximately 709,000 solar panels on 1,300 acres in Wingate, Texas.

In 2022, University of California filed a lawsuit against 8minute Solar. The same year, 8minute Solar Energy announced they had secured $400 million in financing from institutional investor EIG.

See also 

 First Solar
 SolarCity
 Solar power in California

References 

Solar energy companies of the United States
Photovoltaics manufacturers
Companies based in Los Angeles